Prototypes and Painkillers is a compilation album by the punk rock band Strung Out, released on March 31, 2009, by Fat Wreck Chords. It consists of outtakes, demos, and compilation tracks taken from various recording sessions over the course of the band's career, including several previously unreleased tracks.

Track listing

Strung Out albums
2009 compilation albums
Fat Wreck Chords compilation albums